Hunnas waterfall, also known as Hunnasgiriya falls, is located about  from Kandy, Sri Lanka. It is located in Matale District near the village of Elkaduwa. There are two roads to reach Hunnas waterfall, one is coming from Matale to Elkaduwa, the other is Wattegama (Kandy) to Elkaduwa. 
   
It is a man-made waterfall, which is located in the landscaped garden of the Hunnasgiriya Hotel. It is fed by a stream from the nearby Hunnasgeria mountain peak. Apart from the main fall several streams can be seen during rainy seasons.

See also
List of waterfalls in Sri Lanka

References

Matale District
Waterfalls in Central Province, Sri Lanka
Geography of Matale District